Miguel Ângelo da Costa Guimarães (born 3 May 1995) commonly known as Miguel Ângelo,  is a Portuguese footballer who plays for Merelinense, as a defender.

Football career
On 30 July 2014, Miguel Ângelo made his professional debut with Trofense in a 2014–15 Taça da Liga match against Beira-Mar.

Personal
He is a cousin of Tiago Pereira.

References

External links

Stats and profile at LPFP 

1995 births
Living people
Sportspeople from Trofa
Portuguese footballers
Association football defenders
C.D. Trofense players
AD Oliveirense players
C.D. Cinfães players
Merelinense F.C. players
Liga Portugal 2 players